Chouat is a surname of French origin. Notable people with the surname include:

 Didier Chouat (1945–2014), French politician
 Francis Chouat (born 1948), French historian and politician, brother of Didier

Surnames of French origin